Trudge Valley is a valley on the southern side of Windwhistle Peak in the Allan Hills, Oates Land. Reconnoitered by the New Zealand Antarctic Research Program (NZARP) Allan Hills Expedition (1964) who named it after the many journeys along its length.

Valleys of Oates Land